was a Japanese politician. In addition to being a National Diet member, he served as Minister of Finance from 1992 to 1993 and Minister of Health and Welfare from 1982 to 1983.

Early life and education
Hayashi was born in 1927 and was from Shimonoseki in Yamaguchi Prefecture. His grandfather was a member of the House of Peers before World War II.

Hayashi was a graduate of Tokyo University.

Career
Hayashi was a member of the Liberal Democratic Party (LDP). He served at the House of Representatives, also known as Diet. He was first elected for the Diet in 1969. He served as health and welfare minister. In August 1989, he ran for the presidency of the LDP, but Toshiki Kaifu won the election, replacing Sousuke Uno in the post.

As of 1990 Hayashi was part of the faction led by Kiichi Miyazawa within the LDP. He was appointed finance minister in the cabinet led by Prime Minister Miyazawa on 12 December 1992. Hayashi replaced Tsutomu Hata in the post. Hayashi's tenure ended on 9 August 1993 when Hirohisa Fujii became finance minister. Then he began to serve as the chairman of the Diet Members League for Sino-Japanese relations. As of 1998 he served as a special envoy of Prime Minister Ryutaro Hashimoto.

In 2003 Hayashi ended his involvement in politics after serving at Diet ten times.

Personal life and death
Hayashi had a daughter and a son. His eldest son, Yoshimasa, is also a politician and held different cabinet posts.

Hayashi died from multiple organ failure in Tokyo on 3 February 2017 at the age of 89.

References

External links

1927 births
2017 deaths
Deaths from multiple organ failure
Liberal Democratic Party (Japan) politicians
Members of the House of Representatives (Japan)
Ministers of Finance of Japan
People from Shimonoseki
University of Tokyo alumni